Peter Dunn (8 August 1921 – 1 February 2004) was an Australian cricketer. He played eighteen first-class matches for Western Australia between 1948/49 and 1952/53.

See also
 List of Western Australia first-class cricketers

References

External links
 

1921 births
2004 deaths
Australian cricketers
Western Australia cricketers